Elsie is a feminine given name, sometimes a diminutive form (hypocorism) of Elizabeth. It may refer to:

People

Given name
 Elsie Baker (1883–1971), American actress and singer
 Elsie Bertram (1912–2003), English bookseller
 Elsie Bowerman (1889–1973), British pioneering female barrister, suffragette and Titanic survivor
Elsie Cameron Corbett (1893–1977), volunteer ambulance driver in World War I
Elsie Cassels (1864–1938), Scottish born naturalist and Canadian ornithologist
 Essie B. Cheesborough (1826-1905), American writer
 Elsie Dohrmann (1875–1909), New Zealand scholar, teacher and temperance campaigner
 Elsie Ferguson (1883–1961), American stage and film actress
 Elsie Fox (c. 1900–1992), minor screenwriter in the 1930s, married to novelist/screenwriter Paul Hervey Fox 
 Elsie Gibbons (1903–2003), Canadian politician 
 Elsie Griffin (1895–1989), English opera singer
 Elsie Hall (1877–1976), Australian-born South African classical pianist
 Elsie Higgon (1879–1969), English pharmacist
 Elsie Hodder (1886–1952), English actress and singer under the stage name Lily Elsie
 Elsie Inglis (1864–1917), innovative Scottish doctor 
 Elsie Janis (1889–1956), American singer, songwriter, actress, and screenwriter
 Elsie May Kittredge (1870–1954), American botanist
 Elsie Lefebvre (born 1979), Quebec politician
 Elsie Lessa (1912–2000), American-Brazilian journalist and writer 
 Elsie Leung, member of the Executive Council of Hong Kong 
 Elsie Locke (1912–2001), New Zealand writer, historian and activist in the feminism and peace movements
 Elsie Lyon, Canadian politician; see Cooperative Commonwealth Federation candidates, 1953 Manitoba provincial election#Elsie Lyon (Fisher)
 Elsie Mackay (c. 1893–1928), British actress, interior decorator and pioneering aviator who died trying to fly across the Atlantic
 Elsie Maréchal (1894–1969), English woman active in the Belgian Resistance during the Second World War
 Elsie Mitchell (died 1945), American woman killed in Oregon by a Japanese balloon bomb during World War II; see Fire balloon#Single lethal attack
 Elsie Clews Parsons (1875–1941), American anthropologist, sociologist, folklorist and feminist
 Elsie Payne (1927–2004), teacher and first indigenous Barbadian principal of Queen's College of Bridgetown
 Elsie Sigel ca. 1890–1909), American murder victim
 Elsie Snowden, member of the Snowden Family Band, a 19th-century African American musical group
 Elsie Suréna (born 1956), Haitian writer and photographer
 Elsie Tu (Traditional Chinese characters: 杜葉錫恩) (b. 1913), also known as Elsie Elliot, Hong Kong social activist and former member of the Urban Council of Hong Kong
 Elsie Wagg (1876–1949), English philanthropist
 Elsie Wayne (born 1932), Canadian politician
 Elsie Widdowson (1906–2000), British dietitian
 Elsie Jane Wilson (1890–1965), New Zealand-born cinema actress, director and writer in the United States
 Elsie de Wolfe (1865–1950), pioneering professional interior decorator in the United States
Elsie and Mathilde Wolff Van Sandau (alive in 1914), British suffragette sisters
 Elsie Wright (1901–1988), Cottingley Fairies photographer and subject

Short for another name
 Elizabeth Elsie Carlisle (1896–1977), English female singer
 Elizabeth Elsie MacGill (1905–1980), Canadian aeronautical engineer, first woman to earn an aeronautical engineering degree and "Queen of the Hurricanes" (fighter aircraft)
 Eliška Elsie Paroubek (1906–1911), Czech-American girl who was kidnapped and murdered

Fictional characters
 Elsie the Cow, an advertising mascot of the Borden Company
 Elsie, a main character in the Playhouse Disney animated television series Stanley
 Elsie Dinsmore, titular character in the Elsie Dinsmore series by Martha Finley
 Elsie Hooper, title character of the black and white horror serial of the same name, appearing in the UMass Daily Collegian
 Elsie Hughes, the housekeeper on the series Downton Abbey
 Elsie Hughes, in the television series Westworld played by Shannon Woodward
 Elsie Lappin, on the British soap opera Coronation Street in 1960, the first to speak on the series
 Elsie Tanner, on the British soap opera Coronation Street
 Elsie Crimson, a supporting character from the manga and anime series Edens Zero

See also
 Elzie E. C. Segar (1894–1938), American cartoonist, creator of Popeye

English-language feminine given names
Hypocorisms